Dennis Thayne "DJ" Rodman Jr. (born April 25, 2001) is an American college basketball player for the Washington State Cougars of the Pac-12 Conference. At the high school level, he played for Corona del Mar High School in Newport Beach, California, and JSerra Catholic High School in San Juan Capistrano, California. He is the son of Hall of Fame basketball player Dennis Rodman.

Early life and high school career
Rodman attended Kaiser Elementary in Costa Mesa, California and Ensign Intermediate School in Newport Beach for middle school. As a high school freshman, Rodman played basketball for Corona del Mar High School in Newport Beach, California. In his sophomore season, he averaged 19.6 points per game and led his team to a 22–8 record. After the season, Rodman transferred to JSerra Catholic High School in San Juan Capistrano, California. As a junior, he averaged 16.1 points and 6.1 rebounds per game. In his senior season, he averaged 24.2 points per game and 8.9 rebounds per game. In May 2019, Rodman committed to play college basketball for Washington State.

College career
Rodman initially received sparse playing time during his freshman season, but his minutes increased after Tony Miller's ankle injury. On January 16, 2020, Rodman scored a season-high eight points along with five rebounds in a win over Oregon. In his freshman season at Washington State, Rodman averaged 1.7 points and 1.9 rebounds in 11.9 minutes per game through 26 appearances. The season was cut short due to the COVID-19 pandemic. Rodman missed eight games due to an injury during his sophomore season. He averaged 6.1 points and 3.7 rebounds per game.

Career statistics

College

|-
| style="text-align:left;"| 2019–20
| style="text-align:left;"| Washington State
| 26 || 0 || 11.9 || .275 || .286 || .600 || 1.9 || 0.3 || 0.2 || 0.0 || 1.7
|-
| style="text-align:left;"| 2020–21
| style="text-align:left;"| Washington State
| 19 || 10 || 23.3 || .402 || .411 || .750 || 3.7 || 0.9 || 0.4 || 0.1 || 6.1
|-
| style="text-align:left;"| 2021–22
| style="text-align:left;"| Washington State
| 35 || 2 || 19.5 || .420 || .279 || .806 || 4.1 || 0.9 || 0.4 || 0.2 || 4.2
|- class="sortbottom"
| style="text-align:center;" colspan="2"| Career
| 80 || 12 || 18.0 || .386 || .327 || .758 || 3.3 || 0.7 || 0.3 || 0.1 || 3.9

Personal life
Rodman is the son of Dennis Rodman and Michelle Moyer.  His sister is professional soccer player Trinity Rodman.

References

External links
Washington State Cougars bio

2001 births
Living people
American men's basketball players
Basketball players from California
Shooting guards
Sportspeople from Newport Beach, California
Washington State Cougars men's basketball players